The 2020–21 Nemzeti Bajnokság II (also known as 2020–21 Merkantil Bank Liga) is Hungary's 70th season of the Nemzeti Bajnokság II, the second tier of the Hungarian football league system. The season began in August 2020 and finished in May 2021.

Teams
The following teams have changed division since the 2019–20 season.

Team changes

To NB II

From NB II

Stadium and locations

Following is the list of clubs competing in the league this season, with their location, stadium and stadium capacity.

Personnel and kits

Managerial changes

League table

Statistics

Number of teams by counties and regions

See also
 2020–21 Magyar Kupa
 2020–21 Nemzeti Bajnokság I
 2020–21 Nemzeti Bajnokság III

References

External links
  
  

Nemzeti Bajnokság II seasons
2020–21 in Hungarian football
Hun